Henry of Appleford O.S.B. was a Abbot of Reading Abbey monk and ruler of the English county of Berkshire from 1342 to 1361. Originating from the village of Appleford-on-Thames—20 miles north-west and also in Berkshire (now in Oxfordshire) -- all that is otherwise known about him is that his death in 1361 was due to the Black Death.

References

1361 deaths
Abbots of Reading
Benedictine abbots
14th-century English Roman Catholic priests
People from Vale of White Horse (district)
14th-century deaths from plague (disease)
Year of birth unknown